New Zealand Māori rugby league team is a rugby league representative side made up of New Zealand Māori players. The side represents the New Zealand Māori Rugby league. Like its union counterpart, the rugby league team previously competed in international competitions.

With some controversy, the team participated in the 2000 World Cup as Aotearoa Māori. The Super League International Board had agreed to give a place in their World Cup to the New Zealand Māori team as they attempted to gain allies during the Super League war. Despite that World Cup not taking place, the Rugby League International Federation repeated the offer for the 2000 World Cup when it replaced the Super League International Board following the end of the dispute.

History

A New Zealand Māori team first toured overseas in 1908 when they visited Australia. This tour was a success, and was followed by another tour to Australia in 1909 and to Great Britain in 1910.

The first game of international rugby league on New Zealand soil was between the Māori and the touring Great Britain Lions of 1910.

A separate body, the Māori Rugby League Board of Control, was formed in 1934 to administer the game in Māori communities. This governing body was later renamed the Aotearoa Māori Rugby League and in 1992 it was registered as an incorporated society.

The Māori have had a wonderful record of beating international touring teams over the years. In 1983 they visited Britain and a side containing future Kiwis stars like Hugh McGahan, Dean Bell and Clayton Friend proved too strong for the amateur opposition they played. For many years, the Māori have competed in the Pacific Cup alongside other teams with a strong presence of New Zealand–based players—Samoa, Tonga and the Cook Islands, so they thought it was right they should have the opportunity to follow these teams to the World Cup. The invitation to the Māori to take part in the 2000 World Cup came about as a result of promises made to them by the defunct Super League International Board at the height of the Super League war that tore the game apart in the southern hemisphere.

The Māori team has participated in the Pacific Cup (since 1974), Super League's 1997 Oceania Cup, Papua New Guinea 50th Anniversary (1998), 2000 World Cup, World Sevens Qualification (2003) and Pacific Rim (2004) competitions.

The Maori competed against Indigenous Dreamtime team on 26 October 2008 as the curtain raiser to the first match of the 2008 World Cup. The Māori team lost 34–26.

In 2010, the Maori team played England at Mt. Smart Stadium in Auckland before the 2010 Rugby League Four Nations in New Zealand. After trailing 18–0 at halftime, the Maori came back to draw the match at 18–all.

In October 2013, the side faced the touring Murri Rugby League Team in a two–game series. The Maori side, featuring NRL players Charlie Gubb, Sam Rapira and Bodene Thompson, won the first game 48–18 at Davies Park, Huntly. The second game was played at Puketawhero Park, Rotorua and was won by the Maori side, 32–16.

In October 2014, the team will travel to Australia to play against the Queensland Maori team at Owen Park, Southport and the Murri Rugby League Team at BMD Kougari Oval, Wynnum.

In 2018 they took part in the NRL Festival of Indigenous Rugby League held in Redfern Sydney against the First Nation Goannas, they were beat 22–16 in a thrilling finish.

Jerseys
Primary

Alternative

Players

2008 squad

2010 Squad

2013 squad

Team
Name Rohe

1. Zebastion Luisi, Tamaki Makaurau  (Auckland) – Howick Hornets.

2. Thyme Nikau, Tamaki Makaurau  (Auckland) – Howick Hornets

3. Hiwaroa Grant, Te Arawa (Bay of Plenty) – Taniwharau

4. Rusty Bristow, Tamaki Makaurau (Auckland) –     Papakura Sea Eagles

5. Ryan Gordon, Tauranga Moana (Coastline) – Otumoetai Eels

6. Cruz Rauner, Taranaki (Taranaki) – Waitara Bears

7. Cody Walker, Tamaki Makaurau (Auckland) –      Mount Albert Lions

8. Chris Fox, Waikato Maori (Waikato) – Taniwharau

9. Zach Tippins, Tamaki Makaurau (Auckland) –       Mount Albert Lions

10. Jay Pukepuke, Te Waipounamu (Canterbury) –           Halswell Hornets

11. Rulon Nutira, Te Waipounamu (Canterbury) –           Hornby Panthers

12. Arden McCarthy, Tamaki Makaurau (Auckland) –       Pt Chevalier Pirates

13. Dylan Moses, Tamaki Makaurau (Auckland) –       Pt Chevalier Pirates

14. Chance Tauri, Te Awa Kairangi (Wellington) – Te Aroha Eels

15. Tama Kaha, Te Awa Kairangi (Manawatu) – Levin Wolves

16. Tony Tuia, Tamaki Makaurau (Auckland) – Howick Hornets

17. Dominic Bartells, Te Awa Kairangi (Wellington) –       Wainuiomata Lions

Coach: Darren Pirini, Tamaki Makaurau         (Auckland)

2014 Squad

2018 Squad

2019 NRL Harvey Norman All–Stars

The 2019 All Stars match was the eighth annual representative exhibition All Stars match of Australian rugby league. The match was played between the Indigenous All Stars and the Māori All Stars for the first time, the match was played in Victoria's AAMI Park. The Indigenous All Stars won 34–14

2019 squad

2020 squad

2021 squad

2022 squad

Coaches
Also see :Category:New Zealand Māori rugby league team coaches 

Win percentage is rounded to one decimal place.

Key

G: Games played
W: Matches won
D: Matches drawn
L: Matches lost

Results

See also
 New Zealand Māori women's rugby league team
 New Zealand national rugby league team
 New Zealand national rugby union team
 New Zealand Māori rugby union team
 New Zealand Māori cricket team

References

External links
100 years of Māori rugby league 1908 – 2008 Google Books